Government Medical College, Kannauj (GMC Kannauj), also known as Kannauj Medical College, is a government medical college located in Tirwa of Kannauj district, Uttar Pradesh, India.

The college has guidance and mentorship of Ganesh Shankar Vidyarthi Memorial Medical College.

History
Government Medical College, Kannauj was established by SP government in 2006 as Kannauj Medical College, but classes started only in 2012 when Akhilesh Yadav become C.M. of Uttar Pradesh and the institute become recognized for 100 M.B.B.S. seats by Medical Council of India (MCI).

Courses
Every year 100 students are allowed to take admission in the M.B.B.S. course by two competitive examinations. The AIPMT accounts for the filling of 15% seats and remaining 85% seats are filled through a state-level entrance examination UP-CPMT. But since 2016, NEET is the only entrance exam.

Campus
The Government Medical College is situated 15 kilometers away from Kannauj at Tirwa Road of the historic city of Kannauj in U.P. The college is at about 3-hour drive from the state capital Lucknow (1.5-hours by expressway) and there is also construction of 4 lane highway along the college for better connectivity to Kannauj city. The nearest railway station is Kannauj Railway Station (KJN) and Lucknow Airport is the nearest airport to the college.

See also
Government Medical College, Jalaun
Government Medical College, Azamgarh
Autonomous State Medical College Basti
Mahamaya Rajkiya Allopathic Medical College
Shaikh-Ul-Hind Maulana Mahmood Hasan Medical College
Government Medical College, Banda
Dr. Ram Manohar Lohia Institute of Medical Sciences

References

External links
 

Medical colleges in Uttar Pradesh
Colleges in Kannauj district
Kannauj
2016 establishments in Uttar Pradesh
Educational institutions established in 2016